Marilyn Baptiste is a former Chief of the Xeni Gwet'in First Nation in British Columbia, Canada.

She was awarded the Eugene Rogers Award in 2011, for her role in the campaign to save Teztan Biny. She was awarded the Goldman Environmental Prize in 2015.

References

Indigenous leaders in British Columbia
Canadian women activists
First Nations activists
First Nations women in politics
Indigenous peoples and the environment
Living people
Political office-holders of Indigenous governments in Canada
Year of birth missing (living people)
Canadian environmentalists
Canadian women environmentalists
Goldman Environmental Prize awardees